Pierre Roland Renoir, born July 16, 1958, is a Canadian painter and the great-grandson of Pierre-Auguste Renoir.

Born in Monaco, Pierre Roland Renoir was raised in Cagnes-sur-Mer, the town in France where his great-grandfather painted and sculpted in his final years. He developed an interest in the visual arts at a young age and by the time he was fifteen, had already begun working on metallic plates using the dry-point engraving technique.

In 1978, he emigrated to Canada and made his home in Edmonton, Alberta. In 1981, after rebuilding his portfolio, his first professional art exhibition was organized in Edmonton. Encouraged by the response and appreciation of the public, he began a wider range of exhibitions throughout Canada, the United States and Europe.

References

~

1958 births
20th-century Canadian male artists
20th-century Canadian painters
20th-century French male artists
20th-century French painters
21st-century Canadian male artists
21st-century Canadian painters
21st-century French male artists
21st-century French painters
Artists from Edmonton
Canadian male painters

French male painters
Living people
Pierre Roland